"Ride wit U" is a song by American singer Joe from his fifth studio album, And Then... (2003). The track was produced by Frankie "Vegas" Romano and co-produced by production duo Carvin & Ivan. The song features guest vocals by rap group G-Unit.

Released as the album's second single in the United States and first international single along with "More & More", "Ride wit U" reached number 12 on the UK Singles Chart, number 22 on the Billboard Hot R&B/Hip-Hop Songs chart, and number 32 on the Australian Singles Chart, becoming Joe's highest-charting single release since 2000's "Stutter".

Track listing
Digital EP
 "Ride wit U" (main version featuring G-Unit) – 4:10
 "Ride wit U" (no rap) – 3:32
 "Ride wit U" (instrumental) – 4:08
 "More & More" – 3:44

Credits and personnel
Credits are adapted from the liner notes of And Then....
 Songwriting – Ivan Barias, Carvin Haggins, Frank Romano, James Rayshawn Smith, Christopher Lloyd, David Brown
 Production – Frankie "Vegas" Romano
 Co-production – Carvin & Ivan
 Vocal production – Carvin Haggins 
 Arrangement – Jayshawn Champion
 Piano – Jon Denney  
 Recording – Brian Garten, Frank "X" Sutton, Frankie Romano, Mike Wilson 
 Mixing – Serban Ghenea 
 Mixing assistance - Tim Roberts
 Mastering - Herb Powers Jr.

Charts

Weekly charts
"Ride wit U"

"Ride wit U" / "More & More"

Year-end charts

Release history

References

2003 songs
2004 singles
Joe (singer) songs
Jive Records singles
Songs written by 50 Cent
Songs written by Ivan Barias
Songs written by Carvin Haggins
Songs written by Frank Romano
Songs written by Young Buck
Song recordings produced by Carvin & Ivan
Songs written by Lloyd Banks